XHRPV-FM is a radio station on 104.1 FM in Ciudad Victoria, Tamaulipas.

History
XERPV-AM 1340 received its concession on April 5, 1971. The 1,000-watt station was cleared to move to FM at the end of 2011.

References

Regional Mexican radio stations
Radio stations in Ciudad Victoria